TreVeyon Henderson (born October 22, 2002) is an American football running back for the Ohio State Buckeyes. Henderson attended high school at Hopewell High School in Hopewell, Virginia, where he set many school records.

Early life and high school career 
Henderson was born on October 22, 2002, in Hopewell, Virginia. He later attended and played high school football at Hopewell High School in Hopewell, Virginia, where he rushed for over 4,000 yards with 50 touchdowns.

College career 
Henderson officially enrolled at Ohio State in January 2021. He made his collegiate debut against Minnesota in a 45–31 win. In the game, Henderson had two carries for 15 yards and one catch for 70 yards and a touchdown.  in his third game, Henderson broke Archie Griffin’s freshman single-game rushing record with 277 yards on 24 carries and three touchdowns. Overall, it was the third-most yards by an Ohio State running back in a game. For his performance, Henderson earned Big Ten Offensive Player of the Week and Freshman of the Week.  
During Week 13 against the Michigan Wolverines, Henderson broke Ohio State's freshman record for touchdowns from scrimmage with 19.

Statistics

References

External links
 Ohio State profile

2002 births
Living people
American football running backs
Ohio State Buckeyes football players
People from Hopewell, Virginia
Players of American football from Virginia